Mohammad Nokhodi Larimi (born 8  February  2001 in Juybar, Iran) is an Iranian wrestler. He competed in the 2021 World Wrestling Championships at Oslo, Norway, where he won the silver medal in his event.

References

External links 

2001 births
Living people
Iranian male sport wrestlers
World Wrestling Championships medalists
Asian Wrestling Championships medalists
People from Juybar
Sportspeople from Mazandaran province
21st-century Iranian people